Rossbach or Roßbach may refer to:

The place Rossbach, the of which  means "horse brook".

Rossbach is a surname of German origin. It means "rose brook".

Places
 , part of the town Braunsbedra, Saxony-Anhalt, Germany
 Battle of Rossbach, fought 1757
 Rossbach, Austria, a municipality in Upper Austria
 Rossbach, Bavaria, a town in Germany
 Rossbach, Neuwied, a municipality in Rhineland-Palatinate, Germany
 Rossbach, Westerwaldkreis, a municipality in Rhineland-Palatinate, Germany
 Rosbach vor der Höhe, a town in Hesse, Germany
 Rossbach, German name of Hranice (Cheb District), Czech Republic

People
 Ed Rossbach (1914–2002), American fiber artist
 Einar Rossbach (born 1964), Norwegian football goalkeeper
 Gerhard Rossbach (1893–1967), German soldier

Other uses
 Wolf pack Rossbach, a group of German U-boats during the Battle of the Atlantic in World War II

See also
 Rosbach (disambiguation)

German toponymic surnames